MV Harpa was an oil tanker of the Anglo-Saxon Petroleum Company (later Royal Dutch/Shell)
and was in service with the British Merchant Navy during World War II.

World War II
It was bombed on 22 December 1941 at the beginning of the Malayan Campaign at Port Swettenham, with the loss of 4 men.

The remains were buried at the site of what would later become the Cheras War Cemetery, Kuala Lumpur.

Sinking
It was sunk by a British seamine in Main Strait, Singapore† en route to Batavia with a full cargo of aviation spirit on 27 January 1942 with the loss of 7 British officers, 2 Royal Navy DEMS gunners and 25 Chinese crew.

†Tom Simkins MBE, Chief Radio Officer of SS Pinna, stated the sinking to be in the Rhio Strait (now Riau Strait, between Batam and Bintan Islands).

Sources

Oil tankers
World War II tankers
1930 ships
Maritime incidents in January 1942
World War II shipwrecks in the Strait of Malacca
Ships sunk by mines